Burun (also Romanized as Būrūn; also known as Bīrūn, Boroon, and Borūn) is a village in Shivanat Rural District, Afshar District, Khodabandeh County, Zanjan Province, Iran. At the 2006 census, its population was 342, in 68 families.

References 

Populated places in Khodabandeh County